Murray Aitkin is an Australian statistician who specialises in statistical models. He attained his BSc, PhD, and DSc in Sydney University for mathematical statistics in 1961, 1966 and 1997, respectively.

Academic career 
From 1961 to 1964, he was a teaching fellow at Sydney University. Then, from 1996 to 2004, he was a professor in the department of statistics at Newcastle University. He was also a director for the Statistical Consultancy Service at Newcastle University from 1996 to 2000.

Between 2000 and 2002, he went on leave from Newcastle to take on the role of chief statistician at the Education Statistics Services Institute in Washington DC.

Societal recognition 
Between 1971 and 1972, he was a senior fellow for Fulbright, an American exchange scholarship program. Between 1976 and 1979, he was a professorial fellow at the Social Science Research Council, in Lancaster University. In 1982, he was named as an Elected Member of the International Statistical Institute, and in 1984 as a Fellow of the American Statistical Association.

Generalised linear mixed models 
Aitkin's research has been important with regards to different types of mixture models, such as generalised linear mixed models (GLMM), latent class models, and other finite mixture models. Usually, when random effects occur in GLMMs, a normal distribution of N(0,σ2) is assumed. However, Aitkin uses a nonparametric structure (a type of structure which does not involve using set distributions) instead.

In 1981, he co-authored with Darrel Bock and published a paper titled: "Marginal maximum likelihood estimation of item parameters: Application of an EM algorithm" to Psychometrika in which he discussed GLMMs. It was one of first papers to discuss this topic and has received almost 3,000 citations.

References 

Living people
Australian statisticians
Academics of Newcastle University
University of Sydney alumni
People associated with Lancaster University
Elected Members of the International Statistical Institute
Fellows of the American Statistical Association
Year of birth missing (living people)
Place of birth missing (living people)